Bankstatement is a studio album by Genesis keyboardist Tony Banks, issued under a band name and released in 1989. The other band members were singers Alistair Gordon and Jayney Klimek. Banks had the idea for Bankstatement after hearing of the success that Mike + The Mechanics were having in both Europe and America. It was Banks' third studio album (his first issued under a band name and fifth album overall). Steve Hillage, of the band Gong, played guitar and co-produced the album with Banks.

Reception

In a retrospective review, AllMusic praised the album for achieving well-crafted mainstream pop, and regarded it as a mystery that neither the album itself nor its singles were hits. They especially praised the three lead vocalists, saying they "do an outstanding job blending with fluid, often dark soundscapes."

Track listing 
All songs written by Tony Banks.
 "Throwback" – 4:39
 "I'll Be Waiting" – 5:56
 "Queen of Darkness" – 4:26
 "That Night" – 4:41
 "Raincloud" – 4:40
 "The Border" – 5:52
 "Big Man" – 4:16
 "A House Needs a Roof" – 4:07
 "The More I Hide It" – 4:30
 "Diamonds Aren't So Hard" (omitted from LP version) – 5:12
 "Thursday the Twelfth" – 4:48

Personnel 
Bankstatement
 Tony Banks – keyboards, synth bass, synth lead guitar (7), lead vocals (7)
 Alistair Gordon – lead vocals (1, 2, 4, 5, 6, 9, 10), backing vocals
 Jayney Klimek – lead vocals (3, 4, 8), backing vocals

Additional personnel
 Steve Hillage – guitars
 Pino Palladino – bass guitar (1, 2, 4, 5, 11)
 Dick Nolan – bass guitar (3, 6, 7)
 Geoff Dugmore – drums
 Martin Ditcham – congas (5), tambourine (5)
"The Phantom Horns" – brass (1)
 Gary Barnacle – saxophones
 Peter Thoms – trombone 
 John Thirkell – trumpet 
 Derek Watkins – trumpet
 Martin Robertson – saxophones (9, 10)
 John Wilson – additional vocals (1)

Production 
 Tony Banks – producer 
 Steve Hillage – producer 
 Steve Chase – engineer 
 John Gallon – additional engineer
 Paul "Croydon" Cook – additional and assistant engineer 
 Andy Mason – additional and assistant engineer 
 Hugo Nicholson – additional and assistant engineer 
 Simon Osborne – additional and assistant engineer 
 Mike Bowen – technical assistant
 Geoff Callingham – technical assistant
 Halpin Grey Vermier – sleeve design 
 Andrew Olney – cover photography 
 John Swannell – portrait photos

References 

1989 albums
Tony Banks (musician) albums
Albums produced by Steve Hillage
Atlantic Records albums
Virgin Records albums
Albums produced by Tony Banks (musician)